Solacers is a 2012 memoir written by Iranian-American author . The book is a first-person narrative about an abandoned boy growing up on the streets in 1960s Iran, before the Iranian Revolution of 1979.

Awards
2012 Finalist Nonfiction, William Saroyan International Prize for Writing- Stanford University Libraries.

Other Editions
In 2013 Solacers was translated into Persian as Alireza and German as Beraubte Wut.

References

2012 American novels
American memoirs
Novels set in Iran
Books about Iran
Novels about orphans
2012 debut novels